Just One Look is the title of the second EP by The Hollies. It was put out by Parlophone in mono with the catalogue number GEP 8911 and released in the UK in late June 1964. The EP entered the British charts on 27 June 1964 and peaked at #8 on the Record Retailer chart after ten weeks. All songs on this EP were previously released at the time. Side A consisted of the A and B-side to the band's "Just One Look" single released in February 1964. Side B  contained two tracks from the band's debut album, Stay with the Hollies.

Track listing

References

External links
E.P. - Just One Look - The Official Hollies Website

1964 EPs
Albums produced by Ron Richards (producer)
The Hollies EPs
Parlophone EPs